Marcus Junius C. f. M. n. Silanus (c. 26 BC – AD 37) was an Ancient Roman senator who became suffect consul in AD 15. His daughter Junia Claudilla was the first wife of Emperor Caligula.

Biography

Early life
Marcus father was Gaius Junius Silanus who was the son of Marcus Junius Silanus the consul of 25 BC. Marcus had two brothers Decimus Junius Silanus and Gaius Junius Silanus, and a sister named Junia Torquata. Decimus was banished for having an affair with Vipsania Julia during the reign of Augustus. Their mother may have been an Atia, daughter of Marcus Atius Balbus and Claudia. Balbus was the uncle of emperor Augustus.

Political career
Ancient historians considered Marcus Silanus a highly respected man. When Tiberius came to power, if a judicial decision made by Silanus was appealed to the emperor, Tiberius invariably rejected the appeal, trusting Silanus' decision, and Tiberius would send the case back to him. He also had the honour of casting the first vote in the Senate.  Silanus successfully persuaded Tiberius to recall the banishment of his brother Decimus.

Family
Silanus had at least two daughters, Junia Silana and Junia Claudilla. In 33, his daughter Junia Claudilla married Caligula.  She died in 36 or early 37  but according to Philo, Silanus continued to treat Caligula as his own son. In November or December of 37, Caligula had him executed for unclear reasons. Suetonius claims he plotted against Caligula while Philo and other sources claim the emperor was simply annoyed by him.

See also
Junia gens

Citations

References

 Barrett, Anthony A. (1989). Caligula: The Corruption of Power. New Haven: Yale University Press. .
 Ferrill, Arther (1991) Caligula: Emperor of Rome. New York: Thames and Hudson. .
 Garzetti, Albino (1976) From Tiberius to the Antonines: A History of the Roman Empire from AD 12-192. London: Methuen & Co. LTD. .
 Suetonius, Life of Caligula
 Syme, Ronald, The Augustan Aristocracy
 Philo, On Embassy to Gaius

External links
 Life of Caligula by Suetonius (Loeb Classical Library translation)
 Life of Caligula by Suetonius (Alexander Thomson translation)
 On Embassy to Gaius by Philo
 Caligula Caligula - A collection of ancient texts regarding Caligula and the time period in which Marcus Silanus lived.
 The Augustan Aristocracy - Limited Preview in GoogleBooks

Junii Silani
Silanus, Marcus Junius
1st-century Romans
20s BC births
Year of birth uncertain
37 deaths
1st-century BC Romans
Suffect consuls of Imperial Rome
Senators of the Roman Empire
Executed ancient Roman people
People executed by the Roman Empire